Core Creek is a tributary of the Neuse River in Craven County, North Carolina.

References

Rivers of North Carolina